Elizabeth Lorraine Vice (born February 9, 1983) is an American gospel music recording artist and musician from Portland, Oregon. Her music career started in 2015, with the studio album, There's a Light, with Ramseur Records. This album was her breakthrough release upon the Billboard magazine charts.

Early life
Liz Vice was born, Elizabeth Lorraine Vice, on February 9, 1983, in Portland, Oregon, where she was the third of five children. Her physical health declined, when she was 19, having to go on hemodialysis for a three and a half-year stretch, eventually giving her a fistula. She obtained a kidney transplant, in 2005, facilitating her eventual recovery from illness.

Music career
Her music career started in 2012, with the studio album, There's a Light, that was originally released with the Deeper Well Collective, and was later re-released on September 25, 2015, by Ramseur Records. The album was her breakthrough release upon the Billboard magazine charts, where it peaked at No. 6 on the Top Gospel Albums chart, and No. 13 on the R&B Albums chart.

Discography

Studio albums

References

External links
 

1983 births
Living people
African-American songwriters
African-American Christians
Musicians from Portland, Oregon
Songwriters from Oregon
21st-century African-American people
20th-century African-American people